William Major may refer to:

 William James Major (1881–1953), politician in Manitoba, Canada
 William Major (Ontario politician) (1896–1966), Liberal party member of the Canadian House of Commons
 William T. Major (1790–1867), religious leader in Bloomington, Illinois